The 1998 PBA Governors Cup Finals was the best-of-7 basketball championship series of the 1998 PBA Governors Cup, and the conclusion of the conference playoffs. The Formula Shell Super Unleaded and Mobiline Phone Pals played for the 71st championship contested by the league and a rematch of their one-game finale in the 1998 PBA Centennial Cup.

Formula Shell wins their third PBA title and their first in six years, with a 4–3 series victory over the Mobiline Phone Pals.

Benjie Paras won his First PBA Finals MVP in Governors Cup Finals

Qualification

Series scoring summary

Games summary

Game 1

Game 2

Game 3

Silas Mills and Tee McClary combined for the last four points of the Phone Pals after Shell briefly took the upper hand on John Best' jumper, 78–77.

Game 4

Game 5

Glenn Capacio came up with a clutch basket in the final 30 seconds after Shell threatened at 81–82 with 2:01 left on back-to-back triples by Donald Williams. Earlier, five straight free throws by Mills and Tee McClary gave the Mobiline Phone Pals an 82–75 lead.

Game 6

Game 7

Benjie Paras fired 12 of his 18 points in the final quarter as he had all the Zoom Masters' output in an 8–3 run which gave Shell the lead, 90–89, time down to 1:33, Gerry Esplana's fadeaway jumper with 27 ticks left put them in front by three, 92–89. Mobiline had a chance to win it all at the buzzer but Patrick Fran missed a potential game-winning three-point shot with a second left after failing to give the ball to Silas Mills. Shell survived a Mobiline' all-time finals record of 14 three-point shots made, John Best led the Zoom Masters with 31 points, Silas Mills went 6-of-8 from the three-point area to finish with 29 points for the Phone Pals. Benjie Paras on his first Finals MVP and Formula Shell captures on his championship third title.

Rosters

Broadcast notes

References

External links
PBA official website

1998 PBA season
1998
Shell Turbo Chargers games
TNT Tropang Giga games
PBA Governors' Cup Finals
PBA Governors' Cup Finals